Royal Oak is an unincorporated community in Talbot County, Maryland, United States. Royal Oak is located at the intersection of Maryland Route 329 and Bellevue Road, southeast of St. Michaels.

Climate
The climate in this area is characterized by hot, humid summers and generally mild to cool winters.  According to the Köppen Climate Classification system, Royal Oak has a humid subtropical climate, abbreviated "Cfa" on climate maps.

References

Unincorporated communities in Talbot County, Maryland
Unincorporated communities in Maryland
Maryland populated places on the Chesapeake Bay